François d'Harcourt, 12th Duke of Harcourt (10 December 1928 – 5 November 2020) was a French politician.

Biography
He was the son of François-Charles d'Harcourt, the 11th Duke of Harcourt, and Antoinette Gérard, a French resistant. From 1954 to 1955, François served as Chief of Cabinet of the Ministry of Armed Forces. Also a journalist, he was an editor for Jours de France from 1956 to 1958. He was a major reporter abroad in Africa in 1960 and Asia in 1962.

D'Harcourt was elected General Councillor of the Canton of Balleroy, serving from 1955 to 1958 and again from 1967 to 1994. He was elected to the National Assembly for Calvados's 4th constituency on 11 March 1973. He was reelected continuously until 1986. He was a member of the Union for French Democracy and was part of the Centrist Union of Democrats for Progress. On 17 January 1975, he voted to decriminalize abortion under the "Veil Law". In 1988, he was elected to serve for Calvados's 5th constituency, where he remained until 1997.

After his father's death in 1997, d'Harcourt became the 12th Duke of Harcourt and Duke of Beuvron. He was married to Isabelle Roubeau. He died in Annecy on 5 November 2020 at the age of 91.

Works
L'Afrique à l'heure H (1960)
Asie, réveil d'un monde (1963)
Demain, la France, l'Europe, le Monde (1965)

References

1928 births
2020 deaths
Politicians from Paris
Members of the National Assembly (France)
Union for French Democracy politicians
Francois
Dukes of France